Sully-André Peyre (1890–1961) was a French poet and essayist. He wrote both in Provençal and in French. He won a prize from the Académie française.

Early life
Sully-André Peyre was born on 9 September 1890 in Le Cailar, Gard, France. He grew up in Mouriès, Bouches-du-Rhône.

Career
Peyre published Lou Secret, a Provençal paper in 1918. A year later, in 1919, he founded La Regalido, another Provençal journal, with Elie Vianes. He was the founder and editor of Marsyas, a Provençal review, from 1921 to 1961.

Peyre was the author of many poetry collections and essays. He wrote both in Provençal and in French He won the Prix Broquette-Gonin from the Académie française for his 1958 book entitled Poésie.

Personal life and death
Peyre married Amy Silvel, a poet.

Peyre died on 13 December 1961 in Aigues-Vives, Gard, France.

Works

Further reading

References 

1890 births
1961 deaths
People from Gard
20th-century French poets
French magazine editors
20th-century French essayists